Alexander Gennadievich Danilin (b. March 12, 1960) is a Russian psychotherapist, psychiatrist and physician-narcologist, author of ten books, numerous articles, lectures and trainings on addiction psychology and existential psychotherapy.

He is married and has two sons.

Since 2003, Alexander Danilin has been an anchorman of radio program Silver Threads (Serebryanye Niti) that is broadcast by Radio Rossii and is dedicated to the human soul in all its manifestations. A number of the media reported that the Danilin was engaged in practical psychotherapy in Moscow clinics for over 20 years. He is a member of the International Psychoanalytical Association and the head of the drug abuse unit in the Moscow drug abuse hospital No 17. The media and websites of wholesale book-selling companies published information that the book by Danilin LSD: Hallucinogens, Psychedelia, and Addiction Phenomenon was withdrawn from the market by the officers of the Federal Drug Control Service of Russia and Federal Security Service of the Russian Federation.  Danilin's articles by about problems of Russian psychiatry (Dead End, Any Diagnosis in Psychiatry is a Myth, etc.) often caused heated controversy.

References

Bibliography

External links 
 Official website of radio program Silver Threads
 Official videoblog of radio program Silver Threads

1960 births
Living people
Russian psychiatrists
Russian medical writers
Russian non-fiction writers
Writers from Moscow
21st-century Russian writers